Doctor Who ceased production in 1989. A one-off TV movie was produced in the US in 1996, before the series resumed in 2005. The original series (1963–1989), generally consists of multi-episode serials; in the early seasons, and occasionally through its run, serials tend to link together, one story leading directly into the next. The 2005 revival trades the earlier serial format for a run of self-contained episodes, interspersed with occasional multi-part stories and structured into loose story arcs.

For the first two seasons of Doctor Who and most of the third (1963–1966), each episode carries its own title; the show displays no titles for overarching serials until The Savages, at which point the episodic titles cease. The titles below, for these early serials, are those in most common circulation, used for commercial releases and in resources such as the Doctor Who Reference Guide and the BBC's classic episode guide. With the show's revival in 2005, the programme returned to individual episode titles.

Due to the BBC's 1970s junking policy, 97 episodes of Doctor Who from the 1960s are no longer known to exist. As a result, 26 serials are currently incomplete, with one or more episodes represented only by audio, which in many cases is in addition to clips or still frames. For commercial release, some episodes have been reconstructed using off-air audio recordings, paired to surviving visuals or newly commissioned animation.

The story numbers below are meant as a guide to placement in the overall context of the programme. There is some dispute, for instance, about whether to count Season 23's The Trial of a Time Lord as one or as four serials, and whether the unfinished serial Shada should be included. The numbering scheme in this list follows the official website's episode guide. Other sources, such as the Region 1 classic Doctor Who DVD releases, use different numbering schemes, which diverge after the 108th story, The Horns of Nimon (1979–1980).

Series overview

Episodes

First Doctor 
The first incarnation of the Doctor was portrayed by William Hartnell. During Hartnell's tenure, the episodes were a mixture of stories set on Earth of the future with extraterrestrial influence, on alien planets, and in historical events without extraterrestrial influence, such as Marco Polo, one of the lost serials. In his last story, The Tenth Planet, the Doctor gradually grew weaker to the point of collapsing at the end of the fourth episode, leading to his regeneration.

Season 1 (1963–1964)

Season 2 (1964–1965)  

This season saw the departure of Carole Ann Ford as Susan Foreman in The Dalek Invasion of Earth, replaced by Maureen O'Brien as Vicki in The Rescue. William Russell and Jacqueline Hill also departed their roles as Ian Chesterton and Barbara Wright, respectively, in The Chase, replaced by Peter Purves as Steven Taylor.

Season 3 (1965–1966)  

O'Brien departed the role of Vicki in The Myth Makers, replaced by Adrienne Hill as Katarina, and then later by Jackie Lane as Dodo Chaplet. The Savages marked the final appearance of Steven, and The War Machines introduced companions Ben and Polly. The practice of giving each individual episode a different title was abandoned after The Gunfighters, near the end of the season.

Season 4 (1966–1967)  

The Smugglers and The Tenth Planet were the last serials to star the First Doctor, his regeneration to the Second occurring in the latter. It is also notable as the season with the most missing episodes, with not one serial existing in its entirety.

Second Doctor 
The Second Doctor was portrayed by Patrick Troughton, whose serials were more action-oriented than those of his predecessor. Additionally, after The Highlanders, stories moved away from the purely historical ones that featured during William Hartnell's tenure; instead, any historical tales also included a science fiction element. Patrick Troughton retained the role until the last episode of The War Games when members of the Doctor's race, the Time Lords, put him on trial for breaking the laws of time. The Doctor was forced to regenerate and thereafter exiled on Earth.

Season 4 (1966–1967) continued 
This season introduced companions Jamie McCrimmon (Frazer Hines) and Victoria Waterfield (Deborah Watling), in The Highlanders and The Evil of the Daleks, respectively. Ben and Polly departed in The Faceless Ones.

Season 5 (1967–1968)  

This season saw the departure of Watling as Victoria, and the debut appearance of Wendy Padbury as Zoe, and Nicholas Courtney as Colonel Lethbridge-Stewart.

Season 6 (1968–1969)  

Hines and Padbury both departed in The War Games, alongside Troughton. It was the show's last season to be filmed in black and white.

Third Doctor 
The Third Doctor was portrayed by Jon Pertwee. Sentenced to exile on Earth and forcibly regenerated at the end of The War Games, the Doctor spent his time working for UNIT (United Nations Intelligence Taskforce). After The Three Doctors, the Time Lords repealed his exile; however, the Doctor still worked closely with UNIT from time to time. The Third Doctor regenerated into his fourth incarnation as a result of radiation poisoning in the last moments of Planet of the Spiders.

Season 7 (1970) 

From this season onwards the programme was produced in colour. To accommodate the new production methods the number of episodes in a season was cut: season 6 has 44 episodes; season 7 has 25 episodes. The seasons continued to have between 20 and 28 episodes until season 22. This season featured companion Liz Shaw.

Season 8 (1971) 

This season forms a loose arc with the introduction of the Master, the villain in each of the season's storylines, and introduces the companion Jo Grant portrayed by Katy Manning.

Season 9 (1972)

Season 10 (1972–1973)  

This season marked the final appearance of companion Jo Grant and the end of the Doctor's exile on Earth.

Season 11 (1973–1974)  

This season introduces the companion Sarah Jane Smith portrayed by Elisabeth Sladen.

Fourth Doctor 
The Fourth Doctor was portrayed by Tom Baker. He is, to date, the actor who has played the Doctor on television for the longest period of time, having held the role for seven seasons.

Season 12 (1974–1975)  

All serials in this season continue directly one after the other, tracing one single problematic voyage of the TARDIS crew. Despite the continuity, each serial is considered its own standalone story. This season also introduced the character of Harry Sullivan portrayed by Ian Marter as a companion; this character was intended to undertake action scenes, during the period prior to Tom Baker being cast, when it was unclear how old the actor playing the new Doctor would be.

Season 13 (1975–1976)  

During this season, Ian Marter (Harry Sullivan) left after Terror of the Zygons, but returned for a guest appearance in The Android Invasion. Terror of the Zygons also saw the last semi-regular appearance of Nicholas Courtney (Brigadier Lethbridge-Stewart) who did not return until Season 20 in Mawdryn Undead.

Season 14 (1976–1977)  

Elisabeth Sladen (Sarah Jane Smith) left the series this season in The Hand of Fear and was replaced by Louise Jameson (Leela) in The Face of Evil . The season also saw the first story in which the Doctor did not have a companion, The Deadly Assassin.

Season 15 (1977–1978)  

This season saw the final appearance of Leela and the first appearance of K9 as voiced by John Leeson.

Season 16 (1978–1979)  

Season 16 consists of one long story arc encompassing six separate, linked stories. This season is referred to by the umbrella title The Key to Time and has been released on DVD under this title. This season introduced Mary Tamm as Romana I.

Season 17 (1979–1980)  

During this season, the role of Romana was taken over by Lalla Ward.

Season 18 (1980–1981)  

In a return to the format of early seasons, virtually all serials from Seasons 18 through 20 are linked together, often running directly into each other. Season 18 forms a loose story arc dealing with the theme of entropy. Full Circle, State of Decay, and Warriors' Gate trace the Doctor's adventures in E-Space; they were released in both VHS and DVD boxsets with the umbrella title The E-Space Trilogy. This season saw the departure of Romana and the introduction of companions Adric and Nyssa, and soon-to-be companion, Tegan Jovanka.

Fifth Doctor 
The Fifth Doctor was portrayed by Peter Davison.

Season 19 (1982) 

The show moved from its traditional once-weekly Saturday broadcast to being broadcast twice-weekly primarily on Monday and Tuesday, although there were regional variations to the schedule. Castrovalva, together with the previous two serials, The Keeper of Traken and Logopolis, form a trilogy involving the return of the Master. They were released on DVD under the banner title New Beginnings. The season marked the final appearance of Adric.

Season 20 (1983) 

To commemorate the twentieth season, the stories in this season involve the return of previous villains: Omega, the Mara, the Black Guardian and the Master. Mawdryn Undead, Terminus and Enlightenment involve the Black Guardian's plot to force the Doctor's new companion Vislor Turlough to kill the Doctor; they were released individually on VHS and as a set on DVD as parts of The Black Guardian Trilogy. This season was broadcast twice weekly on Tuesday and Wednesday evenings on BBC1. This was the last season to feature Nyssa as a companion.

Season 21 (1984) 

Episodes were broadcast twice weekly on Thursday and Friday evenings, with Resurrection of the Daleks broadcast on two consecutive Wednesday nights in 45-minute, rather than 25-minute, parts. The Caves of Androzani saw the regeneration of the Fifth Doctor, and the season finale The Twin Dilemma was the first story of the Sixth Doctor. The season marked the departure of Tegan Jovanka and Vislor Turlough, as well as the introduction of Nicola Bryant as Peri Brown.

Sixth Doctor 
The Sixth Doctor was portrayed by Colin Baker.

Season 21 (1984) continued

Season 22 (1985) 

The series moved back to once-weekly Saturday broadcasts. All episodes were 45 minutes long, though they also exist in 25-minute versions. Although there were now only 13 episodes in the season, the total running time remained approximately the same as in previous seasons since the episodes were almost twice as long.

Season 23 (1986) 

The whole season is titled as The Trial of a Time Lord, and is split into four segments. The segments are commonly referred to by their respective novelisation's titles (listed below) but the season was broadcast as one fourteen-part story and these titles did not appear on screen. Episode length returned to 25 minutes, but with only fourteen episodes in the season, making the total running time of this season (and subsequent seasons) just over half of the previous seasons, going back to season 7. The season saw the departure of Peri and the introduction of Bonnie Langford as companion Mel Bush.

Seventh Doctor 
The Seventh Doctor was portrayed by Sylvester McCoy.

Season 24 (1987) 

This season was moved to a Monday schedule. Mel Bush left in Dragonfire, and the companion role was taken over by Sophie Aldred as Ace.

Season 25 (1988–1989)  

The series was moved to Wednesdays. The programme celebrated its 25th anniversary with the serial story Silver Nemesis.

Season 26 (1989) 

The final season continued to push the series towards a darker approach, focusing this time more on Ace's personal life as well as The Doctor's past and manipulations. This season set the tone for the Virgin New Adventures novels that followed.

Eighth Doctor 
The Eighth Doctor was portrayed by Paul McGann.  The movie is the only television appearance of this Doctor during his tenure. The only production title held by this story was Doctor Who. The DVD release is titled Doctor Who: The Movie.  In 2013, Paul McGann returned for the second television appearance of the Eighth Doctor in the minisode titled "The Night of the Doctor". Concerning the production code, "TVM" is used in the BBC's online episode guide. The actual code used during production is 50/LDX071Y/01X. Doctor Who Magazines "Complete Eighth Doctor Special" gives the production code as #83705.

Television movie (1996)

See also

 Doctor Who missing episodes
 List of Doctor Who Christmas specials
 List of unmade Doctor Who serials and films
 List of Doctor Who audio releases
 List of Doctor Who home video releases
 List of Doctor Who audio plays by Big Finish
 List of Doctor Who radio stories
 List of special Doctor Who episodes
 Doctor Who spin-offs

References

Citations

General websites

External links
 BBC Classic Series Episode Guide
 BBC Episode Guide (Classic and New Series)
 Doctor Who Reference Guide – detailed descriptions of all televised episodes, plus spin-off audio, video, and literary works.
 
 
 

Doctor Who
Doctor Who serials
Doctor Who series
1963-1996
Doctor Who, 1963-1996
Doctor Who, 1963-1996